"Never Givin' Up on Love" is a song written by Michael Smotherman, and recorded by American country music artist Michael Martin Murphey.  It was released in April 1989 as the lead single from the album Land of Enchantment. The song peaked at number 9 on the U.S. Billboard Hot Country Singles chart and at number 21 on the Canadian RPM Country Tracks chart. The song also appears on the soundtrack of the 1989 Clint Eastwood film Pink Cadillac.

Chart performance

Year-end charts

References

1989 singles
Michael Martin Murphey songs
Warner Records singles
1989 songs
Songs written by Micheal Smotherman
Song recordings produced by Jim Ed Norman